Bill Messer (born 8 July 1915, date of death unknown) was a British cyclist. He competed in the individual and team road race events at the 1936 Summer Olympics.

References

External links
 

1915 births
Year of death missing
British male cyclists
Olympic cyclists of Great Britain
Cyclists at the 1936 Summer Olympics
People from Willesden
Cyclists from Greater London